Military fiction is a genre of fiction, focusing on military activities, such as war, battles, combat, fighting; or military life.

Classes of military fiction
Types of military fiction include:
 War novels, including written military fiction 
 War films, military fiction in cinema 
 Military and war video games

Subgenres of military fiction include:
 Military science fiction
 Naval fiction
 Indian military fiction (of India)

Works and elements of military fiction
Works of military fiction:
 List of military science fiction works and authors

Elements of military fiction:
 Military spacecraft in fiction

Creators of military fiction
 Military-entertainment complex
 List of military science fiction works and authors

References

See also
 W.Y. Boyd Literary Award for Excellence in Military Fiction
 Military history
 Western (genre)
 Chivalric romance (genre)
 Chanbara (genre)
 Wuxia (genre)

 
Genres